Shesh Pir (also Romanized as Shesh Pīr) is a village in Shesh Pir Rural District, Hamaijan District, Sepidan County, Fars Province, Iran. At the 2006 census, its population was 33, in 9 families.

References 

Populated places in Sepidan County